We Are Chicago is an adventure simulation video game developed and published by American developer Culture Shock Games for Microsoft Windows. It was released on February 9, 2017.

Gameplay
We Are Chicago is a video game set in the South Side of Chicago. The player assumes the role of Aaron, a black teenager dealing with the struggles of poverty and living in an area populated by gangs.

Development
During production, Culture Shock founder Michael Block and his team gathered at transit locations in the Englewood neighborhood of Chicago to interview its citizens regarding the problems they faced. They were told stories about the problems faced by these citizens, which included unemployment rates, as well as their portrayal in local media, all of which became the focal point of the video game.

Reception
We Are Chicago received "generally unfavorable" reviews, according to review aggregator Metacritic. Destructoid rated the game a 3/10, criticizing the graphics for its lack of polish and its characters for lack of emotion. Polygon gave the game a 7/10, praising the game's representation of the characters but criticizing character movement. Kotaku stated the game failed to address the broad issue of violence, citing a speech from local activist Ja'mal Green.

References

External links
 

2017 video games
Adventure games
Windows games
Windows-only games
Video games developed in the United States
Organized crime video games
Video games set in Chicago
Gangs in fiction
Violence in video games
Single-player video games